Kaire Mbuende (born 28 November 1953) is a Namibian politician and diplomat. Mbuende served as Namibian ambassador to the United Nations from  August 2006 to December 2010. An ethnic Herero, Mbuende has been a high-level member of the ruling SWAPO Party of Namibia since 1972, and served among others as  information officer in Lusaka, Zambia. From 2016 to 2020 Mbuende served as ambassador of Namibia to the European Union, Belgium and Luxembourg.

On Heroes' Day 2014 he was conferred the Excellent Order of the Eagle, Second Class.

References

1953 births
Living people
Herero people
Permanent Representatives of Namibia to the United Nations
Namibian expatriates in Zambia
SWAPO politicians
Southern African Development Community people